Agnia is a genus of longhorn beetles of the subfamily Lamiinae, containing the following species:

 Agnia bakeri Aurivillius, 1927
 Agnia casta Newman, 1842
 Agnia clara Newman, 1842
 Agnia eximia Pascoe, 1860
 Agnia fasciata Pascoe, 1859
 Agnia lucipor Breuning, 1982
 Agnia molitor (Aurivillius, 1927)
 Agnia pubescens Aurivillius, 1898
 Agnia pulchra Aurivillius, 1891

References

Lamiini
Cerambycidae genera